Dieter Dörr (born 6 August 1957) is a German former diver who competed in the 1976 Summer Olympics and in the 1984 Summer Olympics. He was born in Burgsinn.

References

1957 births
Living people
German male divers
Olympic divers of West Germany
Divers at the 1976 Summer Olympics
Divers at the 1984 Summer Olympics
People from Main-Spessart
Sportspeople from Lower Franconia
20th-century German people